Jerry Anderson may refer to:
Jerry Anderson (diver) (1932–2009), Puerto Rican diver
Jerry Anderson (golfer) (1955–2018), Canadian golfer
Jerry Anderson (American football coach) (born 1945), American former head coach
Jerry Anderson (politician) (born 1935), American state legislator in Utah
Jerry Anderson (safety) (1953–1989), American football safety
Jerry Anderson, character in 40 Days and 40 Nights
Jerry M. Anderson (1933–2008), American professor and academic administrator

See also
Gerry Anderson (disambiguation)
Jeremy Anderson (disambiguation)
Jerome Anderson (disambiguation)
Jeremiah Anderson (disambiguation)